Mill Hill also called Jones Hill is a mountain in Dukes County, Massachusetts. Washaqua Hill is located east-southeast of Mill Hill.

References

Mountains of Massachusetts
Mountains of Dukes County, Massachusetts